Juha is a 1937 Finnish drama film directed by Nyrki Tapiovaara, starring Hannes Närhi, Irma Seikkula, and Walle Saikko. It is set in the 18th century and tells the story of a farmer who has married an orphan girl he raised and how a tradesman tries to get her to run away with him to Karelia. The film is based on Juhani Aho's 1911 novel of the same title.

The film was Tapiovaara's debut. It was released in Finland on 24 January 1937.

Cast
 Hannes Närhi as Juha
 Irma Seikkula as Marja
 Walle Saikko as Shemeikka
 Tuulikki Paananen as Anja
 Aino Haverinen as Shemeikka's mother
 Ida Kuusela as Anoppi
 Hilma Vainikainen as Kaisa
 Kyllikki Väre as summer girl

Reception
Pasi Nyyssönen wrote in the 2012 book Directory of World Cinema: Finland: "Tapiovaara, only 25-years-old when Juha was made, directs with a firm hand and a clear aesthetic vision. Aho's book is determinately translated into the visual language of cinema. The dialogue is reduced to a bare minimum, and the film is narrated poetically using visual symbolism of the natural environment."

See also
 Juha, a 1999 adaptation of the same novel

References

External links
 

1937 drama films
1937 films
1937 directorial debut films
Films based on Finnish novels
Films directed by Nyrki Tapiovaara
Films set in the 18th century
Finnish drama films
Finnish black-and-white films